Peace River was a federal electoral district in Alberta, Canada, that was represented in the House of Commons of Canada from 1925 to 2015. It was a rural riding in northwest Alberta, representing Clear Hills County, Saddle Hills County, Birch Hills County, the County of Grande Prairie No. 1, the County of Northern Lights, Mackenzie County, most of Northern Sunrise County, the Municipal District of Fairview No. 136, the Municipal District of Peace No. 135, the Municipal District of Spirit River No. 133, the Municipal District of Smoky River No. 130 and the northern portion of the Municipal District of Greenview No. 16. Following the Canadian federal electoral redistribution, 2012 the riding abolished into Grande Prairie—Mackenzie (72%) and Peace River—Westlock (28%).

History
This riding was created in 1924 from Edmonton West riding.

Members of Parliament

This riding has elected the following members of the House of Commons of Canada:

Current Member of Parliament

See Chris Warkentin.

Election results

	

Note: Conservative vote is compared to the total of Progressive Conservative and Canadian Alliance vote in 2000.

Note: Canadian Alliance vote is compared to the Reform vote in 1997.

Note: NDP vote is compared to CCF vote in 1958 election.

Note: Progressive Conservative vote is compared to "National Government" vote in 1940 election. Social Credit vote is compared to New Democracy vote in 1940 election.

Note: New Democracy vote is compared to Social Credit vote in 1935 election.

Note: UFA vote is compared to Progressive vote in 1925 election.

See also
 List of Canadian federal electoral districts
 Past Canadian electoral districts

References

 
 Elections Canada 2008 election results
 Expenditures - 2008
 Expenditures - 2004
 Expenditures - 2000
 Expenditures - 1997
 Federal Electoral District Redistribution Report

Notes

External links
 Elections Canada
 Website of the Parliament of Canada

Former federal electoral districts of Alberta
Grande Prairie
Peace River Country